Bharucha is an Indian (Parsi/Dawoodi Bohra) toponymic surname for someone originally from Bharuch in Gujarat, India. It may refer to: 

Albert Turner Bharucha-Reid (1927–1985), American mathematician
Chitra Bharucha (born 1945), British-Indian haematologist, former vice chairman of the BBC Trust
Farzana Barucha, Indian actress, choreographer and model
Jamshed Bharucha (born 1956), Indian cognitive neuroscientist
Kurush Bharucha-Reid (1995–2010), United States Army official
Jimmy Bharucha (–2005), Sri Lankan broadcaster
Nushrat Bharucha (born 1985), Indian film actress
Perin Chandra née Bharucha (1918–2015), Indian author, communist, freedom fighter and peace activist
Rustom Bharucha (born 1953), Indian writer, director and cultural critic
Roshan Khursheed Bharucha, Pakistani politician
Sam Piroj Bharucha (born 1936), 30th Chief Justice of India
Zubin Bharucha (born 1970), Indian former first-class cricketer

Toponymic surnames
Indian surnames
Gujarati-language surnames
People from Bharuch
Parsi people
Dawoodi Bohras